Kedar Pandit (born 6 January 1967) is an Indian tabla player.

Early life and background

Pandit was born in a Marathi family to Prabhakar Pandit and Anuradha Pandit, both acclaimed violinists.

Career
Pandit accompanied Pandit Jasraj on tabla for all of Jasraj's concerts, and accompanies vocalists Kaushiki Chakrabarty and Sanjeev Abhyankar. In 2015 he worked with the actress Ketaki Mategaonkar, composing the music for her album.

Awards and recognition

 Mewati Gharana Purasakaar
 Asthapailu Sangeetkaar - award for all round excellence in music direction.

References

1967 births
Hindustani instrumentalists
Living people
Tabla players
Place of birth missing (living people)